Miss America 1990, the 63rd Miss America pageant, was held at the Boardwalk Hall in Atlantic City, New Jersey on Saturday, September 16, 1989 and was televised by the NBC Network.

The winner, Debbye Turner, was the first Miss Missouri to take the crown. One of the five finalists, Jeri Lynn Zimmerman of Illinois, became known professionally as Jeri Ryan, an actress and one of the stars of the television series Star Trek: Voyager.

Results

Order of announcements

Top 10

Top 2

Awards

Preliminary awards

Non-finalist awards

Quality of Life awards

Delegates

Judges
Debbie Allen
Claudia Cohen
Mike Schmidt
Dr. Joyce Brothers
Merv Griffin
Phylicia Rashad
Donald Trump

External links
 Miss America official website

1990
1989 in the United States
1990 beauty pageants
1989 in New Jersey
September 1989 events in the United States
Events in Atlantic City, New Jersey